Robert Faulkner may refer to:
Roy Faulkner (Robert Faulkner, 1897–?), Canadian association football player
Robert Faulkner (Paralympian) (born 1958), Australian Paralympian
Robert K. Faulkner, American political scientist (see List of Boston College people)
Robert Faulkner (Assassin's Creed), a fictional character